Khorram may refer to:

People with the surname
Ahmad Khorram (born 1950), Iranian politician
Homayoun Khorram (born 1930), Iranian musician

Places
 Khorram Brickworks, Qazvin Province, Iran
 Khorram, Isfahan, Iran
 Khorram, Kerman, Iran
 Khorram, Razavi Khorasan, Iran
 Kharam, Birjand, South Khorasan Province, Iran

See also
 Kharam (disambiguation)